Devoted Artists is a 1919 German silent film directed by Erik Lund.

The film's art direction was by Siegfried Wroblewsky.

Cast
In alphabetical order

References

Bibliography

External links

1919 films
Films of the Weimar Republic
German silent feature films
Films directed by Erik Lund
Circus films
German black-and-white films
1910s German films